Alone Together: The Best of the Mercury Years is a compilation album featuring recordings by trumpeter Clifford Brown and drummer Max Roach in groups together and separately which were originally released on Mercury and subsidiary labels.

Reception

Allmusic's John Bush noted "Verve's two-disc collection of the best recordings from the Clifford Brown-Max Roach Quintet recorded for Mercury/Emarcy between 1954 and 1956 includes a parade of Brown-Roach classics ...The second disc, which doesn't include Brown at all, reels through a highlight film of Max Roach's varied quintets of the late '50s after the death of Brown in 1956. Of course, Roach's sessions during that time feature many great recordings – trumpeter Booker Little is a competent replacement for Brown, and tenors Sonny Rollins, Hank Mobley, and Stanley Turrentine all have great spots – but record buyers expecting this set to live up to its title might be disappointed". The Penguin Guide to Jazz selected this album as part of its suggested Core Collection.

Track listing
Disc one
 "Cherokee" (Ray Noble) – 5:43
 "Joy Spring" (Clifford Brown) – 6:51
 "What's New?" (Bob Haggart, Johnny Burke) – 3:25
 "Mildama" (Max Roach) – 4:32
 "September Song" (Kurt Weill, Maxwell Anderson) – 5:46   
 "What Am I Here For?" (Duke Ellington, Frankie Laine) – 3:09
 "Sandu" (Brown) – 4:55
 "Daahoud" (Brown) – 4:02
 "Born to Be Blue" (Robert Wells, Mel Tormé) – 5:15   
 "Jordu" (Duke Jordan) – 7:46
 "Gertrude's Bounce" (Richie Powell) – 4:10   
 "Stardust" (Hoagy Carmichael, Mitchell Parish) – 3:24
 "Parisian Thoroughfare" (Bud Powell) – 7:19
 "Blues Walk" (Brown) – 6:46

Disc two
 "Dr. Free-Zee" (Roach) – 2:07   
 "Just One of Those Things" (Cole Porter) – 7:21
 "Valse Hot" (Sonny Rollins) – 14:28
 "Tune-Up" (Eddie Vinson) – 7:46
 "Yardbird Suite" (Charlie Parker) – 3:54
 "A Night in Tunisia" (Dizzy Gillespie, Frank Paparelli) – 8:15
 "La Villa" (Kenny Dorham) – 6:17
 "Max's Variations" (Harold Farberman) – 2:20
 "Prelude" (Consuela Lee) – 5:08   
 "Juliano" (Julian Priester) – 5:43   
 "Lotus Blossom" (Arthur Johnston, Sam Coslow) – 5:34
 "The Left Bank" (Brown) – 3:17   
 "Never Leave Me" (Gordon Jenkins) – 6:49

Personnel
Max Roach – drums (All tracks except Disc One: tracks 5 & 9)
Clifford Brown (Disc One), Kenny Dorham (Disc Two: tracks 1–5), Booker Little (Disc Two: tracks 6, 7 & 9), Tommy Turrentine (Disc two: tracks 10–13) – trumpet  
Julian Priester – trombone (Disc Two: tracks 9–13)
Ray Draper – tuba (Disc Two: tracks 6 & 7)
Herbie Mann – flute (Disc One: track 5)
George Coleman (Disc Two: tracks 6, 7 & 9), Harold Land (Disc One: tracks: 1–2, 4, 6–8, 10 & 13–14), Hank Mobley (Disc Two: tracks 4 & 5), Paul Quinichette (Disc One: track 5), Sonny Rollins (Disc One: track 11, Disc Two: tracks 1–3), Stanley Turrentine (Disc Two: tracks 10–13) – tenor saxophone
Danny Banks – baritone saxophone (Disc One: track 9)
Barry Galbraith (Disc One: tracks 3, 9 & 12) – guitar
Ray Bryant (Disc Two: tracks 1, 2 & 13), Jimmy Jones (Disc One: tracks 5 & 9), Richie Powell (Disc One: tracks 1–4, 6–8 & 10), Bill Wallace (Disc Two: track 3) – piano 
Joe Benjamin (Disc One: track 5), Bob Boswell (Disc Two: tracks 10–13), Nelson Boyd (Disc Two: track 5), Art Davis (Disc Two: tracks 6, 7 & 9), Milt Hinton (Disc One: track 9), George Morrow (Disc One: tracks 1–4, 6–8 & 10–14, Disc Two: tracks 1–4) – bass 
Roy Haynes (Disc One: track 5), Osie Johnson (Disc One: track 9) – drums 
The Boston Percussion Ensemble – percussion (Disc Two: track 8)
Abbey Lincoln (Disc Two: track 13), Helen Merrill (Disc One: track 9), Sarah Vaughan (Disc One: track 5) – vocals  
Unidentified string section (Disc One: tracks 3 & 12)
Irving Faberman (Disc Two: track 8), Neil Hefti (Disc One: tracks 3 & 12), Quincy Jones (Disc One: track 9), Ernie Wilkins (Disc One: track 5) – arranger and conductor

References

1995 compilation albums
Verve Records compilation albums
Max Roach albums
Clifford Brown albums
Albums produced by Bob Shad